Held einer Nacht  is a Czech-German comedy film directed by Martin Frič, released in 1935.

It is the German-language version of Hrdina jedné noci.

Cast
 Vlasta Burian - Florian Kerzl
 Else Lord - Plaschek, Schneidermeisterin
 Betty Bird - Elvira Thompson & Hanni, ihr Double
 Theo Lingen - Oberlehrer Schneemilch
 Erik Ode - Jantschi, Reklamezeichner
 Max Liebl - Der Bürgermeister
 Herta Rayn
 Karl Padlesak

References

https://www.filmovyprehled.cz/en/film/395675/hero-for-a-night-german-version

External links
 

1935 films
1935 comedy films
German black-and-white films
Films of Nazi Germany
Films directed by Martin Frič
German multilingual films
Czechoslovak comedy films
German comedy films
Czechoslovak multilingual films
1935 multilingual films
1930s German films
1930s Czech films